It Hates You is the third full-length studio album by American rock band He Is Legend, released July 13, 2009 in Europe and July 21, 2009 in the United States. It is their first album released via Tragic Hero Records.

Track listing

Miscellaneous 
Demos of "Stranger Danger", "Don't Touch That Dial", "Everyone I Know Has Fangs", and "Decisions, Decisions, Decisions" were posted on the band's MySpace on April 24, 2008, as samples of music the band was composing on their sabbatical.
 On July 7, 2009, He Is Legend announced that the album would be released in the UK via LAB Records.
 "China White III" is the sequel to "China White" and "China White II", which appear on the band's albums I Am Hollywood and Suck Out the Poison respectively.
 "The Primarily Blues", "Everyone I Know Has Fangs", "China White III" and "Future's Bright, Man" were made available to listen to prior to the album's release.
 The album's booklet features dedications to deceased relatives of bassist Matty Williams and producer/former guitarist Mitchell Marlow.

Reception 

It Hates You received generally favorable reviews from critics. The album peaked at number 126 on the Billboard 200 and number 4 on the Heatseekers chart.

Personnel 
He Is Legend
Schuylar Croom – vocals
Adam Tanbouz – guitars
Matty Williams – bass guitar
Steve Bache – drums, percussion

Additional musicians
Bibis Ellison – vocals
Andrew Anagnost – cello (tracks 6 and 8)

Production
He Is Legend – producer
Mitchell Marlow – producer, engineer
Al Jacob – producer, engineer
Jamie King – mastering

Illustration and design
He Is Legend – artwork

References 

2009 albums
He Is Legend albums
Tragic Hero Records albums